Margaret Morris (November 7, 1898 – June 7, 1968) was an American film actress of the silent film era and into the 1930s.

Early years
Morris, born in Minneapolis, Minnesota, was the great-niece to former US President Benjamin Harrison. She became interested in acting by her late teens, and moved to Hollywood to pursue an acting career.

Career 
Morris performed in the Ziegfeld Follies in 1912, 1913, and 1920, with the 1912 appearance being her Broadway debut. Her other work on Broadway included Miss 1917 (1917), The Maid of the Mountains (1918), Morris Gest's "Midnight Whirl" (1919), The Blushing Bride (1922), The Yankee Princess (1922), Wildflower (1923), Dew Drop Inn (1923), Sweet Little Devil (1924), Madame Pompadour (1924), and The City Chap (1925).

At 22, Morris starred in her first film, the 1920 movie Her First Elopement. Her career went on a fast track from there, with her starring in eleven films through 1924, which included the 1923 film The Ghost City opposite Pete Morrison, and The Galloping Ace opposite Jack Hoxie in 1924.

Also in 1924, she was one of thirteen girls selected as "WAMPAS Baby Stars", a list that included future Hollywood legend Clara Bow and Elinor Fair. She starred in another twenty eight films through 1929, and was at the height of her career. However, like many early film stars, she did not transition well with the advent of sound films. In 1932 she starred opposite Tom Tyler in Single-Handed Sanders, a western. She had several B-movie roles, mostly uncredited, from 1932 to 1937. Her last film was The Toast of New York, an uncredited role, in 1937.

Later years and death 
Morris retired from acting that same year, but remained in Los Angeles. She died there on June 7, 1968, aged 69.

Partial filmography

 Her First Elopement (1920)
 Hickville to Broadway (1921)
 The Town Scandal (1923)
 Beasts of Paradise (1923)
 The Ghost City (1923)
 The Iron Man (1924)
 The Galloping Ace (1924)
 Welcome Home (1925)
 Wild Horse Mesa (1925) - Sosie
 The Best People (1925)
 Womanhandled (1925)
 Youth's Gamble (1925)
 That's My Baby (1926)
 Born to the West (1926)
 Enemies of Society (1927)
 The Magic Garden (1927)
 Mark of the Frog (1928)
 The Avenging Shadow (1928)
 The Woman I Love (1929)
 Single-Handed Sanders (1932)
 Desert Guns (1936)
 The Toast of New York (1937)

References

External links

Actresses from Minneapolis
American silent film actresses
American film actresses
1898 births
1968 deaths
20th-century American actresses
WAMPAS Baby Stars